NGC 3860 is a spiral galaxy located about 340 million light-years away in the constellation Leo. NGC 3860 was discovered by astronomer William Herschel on April 27, 1785. The galaxy is a member of the Leo Cluster and is a low-luminosity AGN (LLAGN). Gavazzi et al. however classified NGC 3860 as a strong AGN which may have been triggered by a supermassive black hole in the center of the galaxy.

H I deficiency 
Observations of NGC 3860 show that the galaxy has lost approximately 90% of its original hydrogen content. This indicates that NGC 3860 has crossed though the core of the Leo Cluster and that ram pressure exerted by the dense intergalactic medium in the cluster stripped most of the neutral atomic hydrogen from the galaxy.

The gas disk of NGC 3860 is truncated, which is an additional indicator that the galaxy is undergoing ram pressure stripping as it falls into the Leo Cluster.

See also
 List of NGC objects (3001–4000)
 NGC 4522

References

External links

3860
36577
Leo (constellation)
Leo Cluster
Active galaxies
Astronomical objects discovered in 1785
Spiral galaxies
6718